Selective may refer to:
 Selective school, a school that admits students on the basis of some sort of selection criteria
 Selective school (New South Wales)

Selective strength: the human body transitions between being weak and strong. This ranges depending on the initial strength of the person. On some days for example you may be able to lift a heavy weight or open a difficult jar/bottle but in another day you won’t be able to do these things.

See also
 Selective breeding, the process of breeding for specific traits
 Selection (disambiguation)
 Selectivity (disambiguation)